Lara Wollington (born 30 March 2003) is an English actress who was the voice of Lucy in 64 Zoo Lane and portrayed in West End theatre. She is best known for portraying the lead role of Matilda, in Matilda the Musical at London’s Cambridge Theatre.

Career 
After standing-by for the role of Young Fiona and the dual roles of Young Shrek and a Dwarf in Shrek the Musical at the Theatre Royal Drury Lane from September 2011 to February 2012, she began to play Matilda Wormwood in Matilda the Musical at Cambridge Theatre. Wollington began performances in August 2012 and initially shared the role with Lucy-Mae Beacock, Hayley Canham and Chloe Hawthorn and later with: Elise Blake, Cristina Fray and Chloe Hawthorn. Her last show in Matilda was on 29 September 2013. Her other appearances include "Big Brother's Big Mouth" and Princess Florrie in "Florrie's Dragons". In 2012, she starred as Sammy Taylor in the horror film Young, High and Dead.

Wollington went on to perform the role of Sophie in the Birmingham Repertory Theatre's production of the BFG. She was then cast in the original cast of Gypsy at the Savoy Theatre. In 2017, Wollington was cast as the female lead - Pandora - in The Secret Diary of Adrian Mole Aged 13¾ at the Menier Chocolate Factory from July to September. She was one of three girls cast, alongside Georgia Pemberton and Asha Banks.

Personal life 
Wollington attended Spirit Young Performers Company and was a member of their Elite Musical Theatre Team and Elite Dance Troupe. She left the company claiming it took up too much of her time in 2018 She also attends ballet classes at Cheshunt Dancing School in Cheshunt Hertfordshire.

Filmography

Film

Television

Theatre

References

External links 

Lara Wollington on What's on Stage

English actresses
British voice actresses
English stage actresses
Living people
2003 births
English musical theatre actresses